"Stranger than Fiction" is a song by American heavy metal band Five Finger Death Punch. It was included as one of the three bonus tracks on the re-release of their debut album, The Way of the Fist (2007). The song was released as the third single from the album on September 17, 2008.

Track listing

Personnel
Ivan Moody – vocals
Darrell Roberts – guitars
Zoltan Bathory – guitars
Matt Snell – bass
Jeremy Spencer – drums

Chart positions

References

2008 singles
Five Finger Death Punch songs
2007 songs
Songs written by Zoltan Bathory
Songs written by Ivan Moody (vocalist)